Vermillion Township may refer to:

Canada 

Vermillion Township, Kenora District, Ontario

United States 

Vermillion Township, LaSalle County, Illinois
Vermillion Township, Vermillion County, Indiana
Vermillion Township, Appanoose County, Iowa
Vermillion Township, Marshall County, Kansas, in Marshall County, Kansas
Vermillion Township, Dakota County, Minnesota
Vermillion Township, Ashland County, Ohio
Vermillion Township, Clay County, South Dakota, in Clay County, South Dakota

See also 

Vermilion Township, Erie County, Ohio
Vermillion (disambiguation)

Township name disambiguation pages